Bank Al Habib Limited is a Pakistani commercial bank owned by the Dawood Habib Family and is based in Karachi, Pakistan. It is one of the largest bank in Pakistan.

The bank has a branch network of 1075+ branches in 408+ cities across Pakistan with six branches in countries across the world.

They also have wholesale branches in Bahrain, Seychelles and Malaysia and offices in UAE, Turkey (Istanbul), China (Beijing), and Kenya.

History
Habib Group's involvement in banking services dates back to the 1930s. The original Habib Bank began modestly in Bombay in 1941 when it commenced operations with a fixed capital of 25,000 rupees. Impressed by its initial performance, Muhammad Ali Jinnah asked the Habib Bank to move its operations to Karachi after the independence of Pakistan.

After the privatization scheme was announced in 1991 by the Pakistani Government, Habib Group was the first to be granted permission to start a private bank, the Bank AL Habib Limited.

In 2002, HBL has been jointly owned by the government and the Aga Khan Fund for Economic Development. It was nationalized in 1974.

Under the privatization policy of the Government of Pakistan, the Dawood Habib Group was granted permission to set up a commercial bank. Bank AL Habib was incorporated as a Public Limited Company in October 1991 and started banking operations in 1992. (Late) Hamid D. Habib, grandson of the founder a Habib Group, was the first Chairman of Bank AL Habib Limited. He was a Director in Habib Bank Limited from 1954 and its chairman from 1971 until nationalization. After the death of Hamid D. Habib in May 2000, Ali Raza D. Habib, who was Director on the Board, was appointed the Chairman of the Bank.

Rashid D. Habib, who was the managing director of Habib Bank Limited from 1953 till its nationalization, was appointed as the managing director and chief executive of Bank AL Habib Limited until he died in 1994. After his death, Abbas D. Habib who was the joint managing director and closely associated with the bank since its inception in 1991, was appointed as the managing director and Chief Executive of the Bank. On 1 November 2016, he was appointed as chairman.

In 2005, Bank AL Habib began offering internet banking, with accounts and records visible online. In 2006, Bank AL Habib became partners with MasterCard, allowing them to issue credit cards for the first time.

Bank Al Habib has decided to purchase from TPL Properties, Centrepoint, a high-rise building in Karachi.

Services
The bank maintains correspondent relations with American Express Bank, USA; Banco di Roma, Italy; Commerzbank and Dresdner Bank, Germany; The Royal Bank of Canada, Canada; and The Hongkong and Shanghai Banking Corporation, Hong Kong.

The bank follows the internet banking code NetBanking and security is entrusted by Verisign. This was launched with a contract made with TPS Pakistan. The bank supports the MNET Switch as a result of MoU signed between MNET and 1-Link.

Bank AL Habib is one of the eleven partners of 1-Link system, an inter-bank ATM sharing system which allows customers to transact on ATM of any partner bank. Bank AL Habib is the third largest ATM service provider in Pakistan, having 196 ATMs while having the largest number of ATMs in the city of Karachi.

In affiliation with Arab Financial Services, the bank offers two types of MasterCard.

The bank has a major ownership stake in AL Habib Capital Markets (Pvt) Ltd, a brokerage house working under the logo of Bank AL Habib.

Executive leadership
Abbas D. Habib, Chairman 
Mansoor Ali Khan, CEO 
Qumail R. Habib, Executive Director 2018

Former Chairmen and Chief Executives of Bank AL Habib Limited include: Hamid D. Habib, Chairman (till 2000), Rashid D. Habib, CEO & Managing Director (till 1994), Abbas D. Habib CEO & Managing Director (till 2016 due to becoming Chairman) and Ali Reza D. Habib, Chairman (till 2016).

Branches

The bank has a network of 1075+ branches (inclusive of Islamic, Conventional & Sub-branches) and three offshore banking units in Bahrain, Turkey and EPZ.

Pakistan
Faisalabad: around 4 branches, including an Islamic banking branch
Gharo (Thatta): 1 branch
Hyderabad: around 4 branches
Islamabad: around 4 branches
Karachi: around 220 branches, including an international branch and an Islamic banking branch
Kunri: one branch
Lahore: around 31 branches including an Islamic banking branch
Mirpur Khas: around 2 branches
Naukot: 1 branch
Jhuddo: 1 branch
Digri: 1 branch
Mithi: 1 branch
Multan: around 10 branches including an Islamic banking branch
Quetta: 1 branch at MA Jinnah Road
Sukkur: around 4 branches, including an Islamic banking branch
Shaheed Benazirabad: around 3 branches, including an Islamic banking branch 
Sargodha: around 3 branches
Timergara: around 2 branches
skardu baltistan: around 2 branches
Gambat: 1 branch
Pakpattan: 1 branch
Bhakkar: 1 branch
Dalbandin: 1 branch
Nooriabad: 1 branch
Kot Ghulam Muhammad (JAMESABAD) 1 Branch.

Bahrain
Manama: one branch which acts as an offshore banking unit

Reputation
The bank was selected as one of the top 200 Best Under A Billion companies by Forbes Asia in their annual review of 2005.

The Asian Banker "Strongest Bank Balance Sheet in Pakistan, 2013".

Profitability 
Bank AL Habib profit for half year ended June 30, 2020, stood at Rs 7.32 billion.

Deposits 
Bank AL Habib deposits exceeded Rs. 1 trillion in 2020.

References

External links

Bank AL Habib Limited
The Habib Group website

Banks of Pakistan
Companies based in Karachi
Companies listed on the Pakistan Stock Exchange
Pakistani companies established in 1991
Bank of America legacy banks
House of Habib